Porque Tengo Tu Amor is the fifth studio album by Mexican group Los Caminantes, released in 1984.

Track listing

References
Allmusic page

1984 albums
Los Caminantes albums